'Knob Lick' is an unincorporated community in Metcalfe County, Kentucky, United States. Knob Lick has a post office with ZIP code 42154.

History
Knob Lick was settled in the 1790s as part of a tract of land granted to Austin Allen. The community was originally known as Antioch after the local church, which opened in 1838. A post office opened on June 10, 1848, under the name Knob Creek; the name was changed to Antioch in 1851, and the post office closed in 1857. The post office reopened on July 23, 1867, as Knob Lick; Frank S. Ewing was the first postmaster of the new post office. The name Knob Lick came from a lick located south of a knob north of the post office.

References

Unincorporated communities in Metcalfe County, Kentucky
Unincorporated communities in Kentucky